Domitia is a genus of longhorn beetles of the subfamily Lamiinae, containing the following species:

 Domitia aenea (Parry, 1849)
 Domitia cervina Hintz, 1913
 Domitia lupanaria Thomson, 1858 
 Domitia marshalli Breuning, 1935
 Domitia pilosicollis (Hope, 1843)
 Domitia viridipennis (Chevrolat, 1855)

References

Lamiini